Mohamed Ali Nafkha (born January 25, 1986, in Sousse) is a Tunisian football player who is currently playing for ES Hammam-Sousse.

Nafkha scored twice in Étoile du Sahel's CAF Confederation Cup 2006 group stage match against Espérance to help seal their place in the final.

On 12 December 2010, he has signed a four-year contract with Swiss Super League club FC Zurich.

In 2020 he retired and became assistant manager of Étoile du Sahel.

References

External links
 

1986 births
Living people
Tunisian footballers
Association football midfielders
Tunisia international footballers
2010 Africa Cup of Nations players
Étoile Sportive du Sahel players
FC Zürich players
ES Hammam-Sousse players
Tunisian expatriate footballers
Expatriate footballers in Switzerland
Tunisian expatriate sportspeople in Switzerland